Brandon is an unincorporated community in Perkins County, Nebraska, United States.

History
Brandon got its start when the Burlington Railroad was extended to that point. A post office called Brandon was established in 1890. The origin of the name Brandon is unclear. It might be either the name of a railroad official, or named after a place in Ohio.

References

Unincorporated communities in Perkins County, Nebraska
Unincorporated communities in Nebraska